Tsuyoshi Hiroshige (廣重毅 Hiroshige Tsuyoshi, November 1, 1947 – April 18, 2018) was a Japanese martial artist and karate instructor. Hiroshige is the founder and first chairman of Kyokushin Budo Karate Federation Kyokushin Kenbukai.

History
Tsuyoshi Hiroshige was born in Kitakyushu, Fukuoka Prefecture on November 1, 1947. In June 1973, when Hiroshige was 25 years old, he entered the Kyokushin Kaikan General Headquarters.

While Mas Oyama was alive, Hiroshige was in charge of the Tokyo Jonan Branch of the International Karate Organization. During his time as the head of the Jonan Kawasaki branch, he tutored many future legends of the Kyokushin Karate. These include Kenji Midori (currently Shinkyokushinkai representative), and Hajime Kazumi. After the death of Kyokushin founder Mas Oyama in April 1994, Hiroshige was the director of the Kanto Headquarters of the Kyokushin Kaikan, during the time when organization was headed by Shokei Matsui. In December 2002, having disagreed with direction Shokei Matsui was taking Kyokushin, Hiroshige, along with Hatsuo Royama, quit Matsui's Kyokushin organization

The following year, in January 2003, he joined the Kyokushin-kan International Organization Honbu, which was established by Hatsuo Royama, and served as the organization's deputy director. In Kyokushin-Kan, he would again tutor many martial artists that would later win Karate championships, including Ryosuke Tokaibayashi, Nozomu Natsuhara, Yusuke Fujii, and Masaki Fujii. To honour for his prestige in martial arts instruction, the 1st Hiroshige Dojo Cup Kyokushin Karate Championship was held at the Kawasaki Gymnasium in In August 2013.

In February 2017, he resigned from the post of deputy director, voluntarily withdrew from Kyokushin-kan. Hiroshige would subsequently establish the "Kyokushin Budo Karate Federation Kyokushin Kenbukai". Hiroshige died on April 18, 2018 at the age of 70.

References

1947 births
2018 deaths
Japanese male karateka
Karate coaches
Kyokushin kaikan practitioners